The Hot Summer of 1975 was a tumultuous period in Portuguese history characterized by political, social and military instability. At the center of the conflict was the rift between rightist and leftist groups, as well as the rift among leftist groups themselves.

Although tensions can be said to have started after António de Spínola's resignation in the 30th of September of 1974, and ultimately culminated in the failed coup of 25 November 1975, most of the violence and tensions that gave the period its name lasted throughout the eponymous summer of 1975. Violence, including some of the most brutal continued into the next year and into the 70s and 80s.

See also
 Carnation Revolution
 Portuguese transition to democracy
 Portuguese Third Republic
 Years of Lead (Italy)

References

1975 in Portugal
April 1975 events in Europe
Conflicts in 1975